Glyceria is a widespread genus of grass family common across Eurasia, Australia, North Africa, and the Americas.

Glyceria is known commonly as mannagrass in the United States, or, in the UK, sweet-grass. These are perennial rhizomatous grasses found in wet areas in temperate regions worldwide. The base of the grass grows along the ground and may root at several places. Then it grows erect and bears leaf blades which may be flat or folded. The panicle inflorescences nod when heavy.  Some mannagrasses are considered weeds while others are endangered in their native habitats.

 Species
 Glyceria acutiflora - creeping mannagrass - China, Korea, Japan, northeastern + east-central USA
 Glyceria alnasteretum - Alaska, Russian Far East, Japan, Korea
 Glyceria × amurensis - Amur Oblast
 Glyceria arkansana - Arkansas mannagrass - south-central USA
 Glyceria arundinacea - Eurasia from Hungary to Korea
 Glyceria australis - Australian sweetgrass - Australia
 Glyceria borealis - northern mannagrass - western, north-central, + northeastern USA incl Alaska; Canada incl Yukon + Northwest Territories; Mexico (Chihuahua)
 Glyceria canadensis - rattlesnake mannagrass, Canadian mannagrass - Canada; USA (Northeast, Great Lakes, Oregon, Washington)
 Glyceria caspia - Caucasus
 Glyceria chinensis - China (Yunnan, Guizhou)
 Glyceria colombiana - Colombia
 Glyceria declinata - waxy mannagrass, low glyceria, small sweet-grass - Europe, Morocco, Madeira, Azores, Canary Islands; naturalized in scattered locales in North America
 Glyceria depauperata - Japan, Kuril Islands
 Glyceria × digenea - France, Czech Republic
 Glyceria drummondii - Western Australia
 Glyceria elata - tall mannagrass - western USA, British Columbia, Alberta
 Glyceria fluitans - water mannagrass, floating sweet-grass - Morocco; Eurasia from Iceland + Portugal to Turkmenistan
 Glyceria × gatineauensis - Québec, New York, West Virginia
 Glyceria grandis - American mannagrass - USA incl Alaska; Canada incl Yukon + Northwest Territories
 Glyceria insularis - Tristan da Cunha
 Glyceria ischyroneura - Japan, Kuril Islands, Korea
 Glyceria latispicea - New South Wales
 Glyceria leptolepis - Russian Far East, China incl Taiwan, Korea, Japan
 Glyceria leptorhiza - Korea, Honshu, Hokkaido, Heilongjiang, Amur Oblast, Khabarovsk, Zabaykalsky Krai
 Glyceria leptostachya - davy mannagrass, narrow mannagrass - California, Oregon, Washington, British Columbia, Alaska
 Glyceria lithuanica - Lithuanian mannagrass - northern Eurasia from Norway to Korea
 Glyceria maxima - reed mannagrass, English watergrass, reed sweet-grass - Eurasia from Ireland to Xinjiang
 Glyceria melicaria - melic mannagrass - eastern North America
 Glyceria multiflora - Chile, Argentina, Uruguay, Rio Grande do Sul, Santa Catarina
 Glyceria nemoralis - Caucasus, central + eastern Europe
 Glyceria notata - marked glyceria, plicate sweet-grass - Eurasia + North Africa from Denmark + Morocco to Xinjiang
 Glyceria nubigena - Great Smoky Mountain mannagrass - Great Smoky Mountains of North Carolina + Tennessee
 Glyceria obtusa - Atlantic mannagrass - eastern North America
 Glyceria occidentalis - northwestern mannagrass - California, Oregon, Washington, British Columbia, Idaho, Nevada
 Glyceria × ottawensis - Ontario
 Glyceria × pedicellata - northern + central Europe
 Glyceria pulchella - MacKenzie Valley mannagrass, beautiful glyceria  - Alaska, western Canada incl Yukon + Northwest Territories
 Glyceria saltensis - Salta Province in Argentina
 Glyceria septentrionalis - floating mannagrass - eastern USA, eastern Canada, northeastern Mexico
 Glyceria spicata - India, Mediterranean
 Glyceria spiculosa - eastern Russia, northern China, Korea
 Glyceria striata - fowl mannagrass, ridged glyceria - Canada incl Arctic Territories, USA incl Alaska, Mexico, Guatemala
 Glyceria × tokitana Masamura - Japan
 Glyceria tonglensis C.B.Clarke - Himalayas, China incl Tibet

 formerly included
Numerous species now considered better suited to other genera: Arctophila Catabrosa Colpodium Dryopoa Eragrostis Hydrocotyle Melica Phippsia Poa Puccinellia Scolochloa Torreyochloa Triplasis

References

 
Poaceae genera
Grasses of Africa
Grasses of Asia
Grasses of Europe
Grasses of North America
Grasses of Oceania
Grasses of South America